The 2015–16 Tulane Green Wave women's basketball team will represent Tulane University during the 2015–16 NCAA Division I women's basketball season. The Green Wave, led by twenty-second year head coach Lisa Stockton, played their home games at Devlin Fieldhouse and were second year members of the American Athletic Conference. They finished the season 23–12, 11–7 in AAC play to finish in fifth place. They advanced to the semifinals of the American Athletic women's tournament where they lost to Connecticut. They were invited to the Women's National Invitational Tournament where defeated Alabama and Georgia Tech in the first and second rounds before losing to Florida Gulf Coast in the third round.

Media
All Green Wave games will be broadcast on WRBH 88.3 FM. A video stream for all home games will be on Tulane All-Access, ESPN3, or AAC Digital. Road games will typically be streamed on the opponents website, though conference road games could also appear on ESPN3 or AAC Digital.

Roster

Schedule and results

|-
!colspan=9 style="background:#00331A; color:#87CEEB;"| Exhibition

|-
!colspan=9 style="background:#00331A; color:#87CEEB;"| Non-conference regular season

|-
!colspan=9 style="background:#00331A; color:#87CEEB;"| Conference regular season

|-
!colspan=12 style="background:#004731;"| American Athletic Conference Women's tournament

|-
!colspan=12 style="background:#004731;"| WNIT

Rankings

See also
 2015–16 Tulane Green Wave men's basketball team

References

Tulane
Tulane Green Wave women's basketball seasons
2016 Women's National Invitation Tournament participants
Tulane
Tulane